Hraschina is the official name of an iron meteorite that fell in 1751 near the Hrašćina village in Hrvatsko Zagorje, Croatia. This meteorite is important because it was the first fall of an iron meteorite viewed and reported by a significant number of witnesses, despite its low remaining total known weight. The Hraschina meteorite also proved that rocks really can "fall from the skies".

History

Many people taking their Sunday evening walk witnessed the event. Baltazar Adam Krčelić, a clergyman, historian, and a noted chronicler of daily events, who was spending time in the village of Biškupec, recorded the following:
"In Biškupec near Varaždin  an unusual phenomenon like a small cloud was seen — although it was not a cloud — which became paler and paler, produced an explosive sound and then dispersed. In their ignorance, the common folk thought that the heavens had opened."

The larger mass penetrated  into the ground. But there are reports that it went much deeper. The smaller mass was split at the place of the fall and partly used by the local villagers for making nails, while the rest of it was split further in Bratislava and subsequently lost.

The Zagreb Catholic chapter sent the meteorites and an official report (the "Protocol of Bishop Klobuczezky and Curate-General Wolfgang Kukuljevic") to the Empress Maria Theresa. The meteorites were deposited in the Treasury in Vienna and then to the Court museum, now the Naturhistorisches Museum Wien (Museum of Natural History in Vienna).

On the basis of the Protocol of Bishop Baron Klobuczezky and the fact that these fresh fallen meteorites presented a molten metal crust, in 1794 Ernst Chladni proposed that meteorites have their origins in outer space. Since meteorites were thought to be of volcanic origin, this was a very controversial statement at the time, but in
1803 was confirmed by Jean Baptiste Biot and was then accepted.

In 1808 Count Alois von Beckh Widmanstätten discovered the Widmanstätten patterns by heating a slab of this meteorite.  "Though another scientist, G. Thomson, had also discovered the texture, Widmanstätten's work was recognized by Carl von Schreibers (then Director of the Vienna Natural History Cabinet) and the term Widmanstätten has been used to describe the texture ever since."

Composition and classification

Hraschina is an iron meteorite chemical type IID, structural class medium octahedrite.

Composition: Fe 89%, Ni 10.5%, Ge 89.4 ppm, Ga 74.5 ppm, Ir 13 ppm.

Samples distribution
The main mass is conserved at the Naturhistorisches Museum Wien. The second largest mass is a piece of  recently discovered within an old collection. Other pieces are:  at MiN of Berlin,  at the Natural History Museum of London, and a few smaller pieces in other institutions. The largest mass shows evidence of a spirited attack with a hammer-like object.

See also
 Glossary of meteoritics

Notes

External links

The meteorite collection of the Natural History Museum, Vienna
Proslava obljetnice pada metorita u Hrašćini 

Meteorites found in Croatia
1751 in Europe
18th century in Croatia